St Thomas of Canterbury College is a college for year 7 to 13 boys and offers a Catholic education to its students. It is located in Christchurch, New Zealand. The college is integrated into the state education system under an integration agreement which was first entered into by the Christian Brothers (as the proprietors of the college) and the Government of New Zealand on 11 November 1981 under Section 7 of the Private Schools Conditional Integration Act 1975. St Thomas of Canterbury College is located in the Christchurch suburb of Sockburn.

Roll
In 2006 the ethnic composition of St Thomas of Canterbury College was New Zealand European/Pākeha 72%, Māori 7%, Samoan 3%, Other Pacifica 1%, Asian 13%, Middle Eastern 2% and Others 2%. The college excels in sporting, cultural, scientific and enterprise activities. Academically, the school offers for senior years the National Certificate of Educational Achievement assessment system (NCEA). The College has an enrolment scheme "to avoid overcrowding, or the likelihood of overcrowding" that gives priority of enrolment to students if they meet the defined criteria of connection with the Catholic faith and live within the Catholic Parishes of Sockburn, Hornby and Darfield, Riccarton, Hoon Hay and Halswell, Leeston, Lincoln and Akaroa. These are generally to the west and south of the city of Christchurch

History

Origins
A Christian Brothers' school in Christchurch was first proposed in the 1880s. The third Catholic Bishop of Christchurch, Patrick Francis Lyons (Bishop 1944–1950) acquired land on Sockburn in West Christchurch and formally invited the Christian Brothers to provide the staff. There was no progress for several years. Eventually Brother Marlow, the Provincial of the Christian Brothers, and Edward Michael Joyce, the fourth Catholic Bishop of Christchurch (Bishop 1950–1964), agreed, and St Thomas of Canterbury College held its first classes on 6 February 1961 (Waitangi Day – not a public holiday then).

Early days
The initial roll was 99 students in Forms 1–3 (years 7–9). The foundation staff were Brothers James Ignatius McClintock (Principal), Ian T Mahon and Carroll. Brother Simon Germaine Coughlan joined them in 1962. The school expanded its area when eight acres was acquired on the other side of Middle Park Road to be used as sports fields. Later several smaller areas were acquired to extend the fields, provide better access to them from the school, provide changing sheds and to provide a site for a residence for the Brothers. In 1964 Edward Joyce, the Bishop of Christchurch, transferred the ownership of the school to the Christian Brothers. The college obtained scholastic success very early, especially when three students (J.G. Cleary, P.M. Heffernan and K.F. Hosking (Cleary and Hosking were both in the lower sixth form)) obtained Junior National University Scholarships in 1967. The New Zealand Herald commented that this was remarkable as St Thomas of Canterbury College was a new school and it was only the third year that it had an upper sixth form).

2011 earthquake
Except for minor damage, the college was spared by the Christchurch earthquakes. As a result of the 22 February earthquake in 2011, Catholic Cathedral College relocated to St Thomas of Canterbury College and "site shared". The reason for this was that although it was not significantly damaged, parts of Catholic Cathedral College were under the unstable 400-ton dome of the Christchurch Catholic Cathedral. Because the dome was in imminent danger of collapse, the college had to move.  St Thomas' restricted its own use of the school to the morning and Catholic Cathedral College took over the school in the afternoon. The dome was removed on 26 July and Catholic Cathedral College moved back to its own site on 1 August 2011.

Golden jubilee 
In spite of the threat of earthquakes, the college celebrated its Golden Jubilee or 50th anniversary on 6–9 October 2011. "Around three hundred people were present and they revelled in: sports, fire dances, haka, tours, hangi, dancing, food, drink, rugby and spiritual celebrations." The events included a "50th Jubilee Celebration Day" to allow Old Boys to meet the pupils and see the school operating during a school day. An assembly included a Powhiri, Waiata and other songs, a Samoan fire dance, a PowerPoint presentation of the history of the College, the presentation of a time capsule and the cutting of a Jubilee Cake. John Airey, the first student to arrive at the college on 6 February 1961 was presented to the assembly. This was followed by a Hangi. There were sporting competitions with St Kevin's College to celebrate the 50th Anniversary of sporting exchanges between the two Colleges (they started in the school's first year). St Thomas's won the Rugby (54–0), but lost the Basketball (59–57) and the Football (4–0). A cricket match had to be cancelled because of rain. The 50th Celebration Dinner was held at the Showgate Room at Riccarton Raceway Function Centre. Former staff members including Christian Brothers were present. All these events were timed not to clash with games of the 2011 Rugby World Cup. The Jubilee Mass was celebrated by Bishop Barry Jones of Christchurch on Sunday 9 October in the St Thomas of Canterbury College hall.

Christian Brothers 
The last Christian Brother formal employment on the teaching staff of the college was in the early 2000s, but some brothers continued to teach at the college as volunteers. As proprietors of the college, they continued to appoint their representatives to the board under the Private School Conditional Integration Act 1975. In 2019, after 58 years, the Christian Brothers transferred ownership of the college to the Bishop of Christchurch.

Houses
The names and colours of the St Thomas of Canterbury College Houses are:
 Joyce – Red
 Marlow – Yellow
 McClintock – Green
 Rice – Black

Principals
 Bro J I McClintock: (1961–1966) (Foundation Principal)
 Bro M B Scanlan: (1967–1972)
 Bro F C Waigth: (1973–1978)
 Bro J H Shepherd: (1979–1981)
 Bro V I Jury: (1982–1987)
 Bro N C Gillies: (1988–1994)
 Bro R J Walsh: (1994–2000)
 Bruce Stevenson: (2001–2007) (first non-Christian Brother principal)
 Christine O'Neill: (2008–2017)
 Steve Hart (2018–present)

Notable alumni

 John Gerald Clearycomputer science academic, entrepreneur, politician and promoter of transcendental meditation
 Sam DicksonNew Zealand rugby sevens player; member of the New Zealand national rugby sevens team to the 2016 Summer Olympics
 Álvar GimenoSpanish professional rugby union player at centre for Valladolid and the Spain national team
 Mark Garry Hammettrugby union player for the New Zealand All Blacks; assistant coach for the Crusaders; coach for the Hurricanes; and rugby administrator
 Uwe Helurugby union player for the Japan national team
 Adam Highfieldprofessional New Zealand soccer player
 Members of the Holy Toledos rock-folk group: Mick Gregg, Brendan Gregg, Adam Gallagher, Tom Mahon, Paul McGuigan

 Ryan Nelseninternational soccer player; captain of the All Whites, the New Zealand national football team
 Vincent O'Malley, Historian
 Darron Reekersinternational cricketer; in Cricket World Cup squad for The Netherlands national cricket team

See also

 List of schools in New Zealand
 Education in New Zealand
 Catholic Church in New Zealand

Notes

References/Sources

 J.C. O'Neill, The History of the Work of the Christian Brothers in New Zealand, unpublished Dip. Ed. thesis, University of Auckland, 1968.
 St Thomas' Jubilee 1961–1986, St Thomas of Canterbury Jubilee Committee, Christchurch, 1986.
 Paul Malcolm Robertson, Nga Parata Karaitiana The Christian Brothers, A Public Culture in Transition, A Comparative Study of the Indian and New Zealand Provinces, an unpublished thesis for MA in Anthropology, University of Auckland, 1996.
 Graeme Donaldson, To All Parts of the Kingdom: Christian Brothers In New Zealand 1876–2001, Christian Brothers New Zealand Province, Christchurch, 2001.
 Education Review Office, Education Review Report: St Thomas of Canterbury College, November 2005

External links
 St Thomas of Canterbury College website
 Edmund Rice Network
 Catholic-hierarchy website
 Catholic Diocese of Christchurch
 Catholic Church in New Zealand

Secondary schools in Christchurch
Boys' schools in New Zealand
Congregation of Christian Brothers secondary schools
Congregation of Christian Brothers in New Zealand
Educational institutions established in 1961
Catholic secondary schools in Christchurch
1961 establishments in New Zealand